Auburn National Bancorporation, Inc. is a bank holding company. The Company’s business is primarily the management of the Auburn Bank, which is an Alabama state member bank. The Bank offers financial products and services including checking, savings, and lending.  The bank is a member of the Federal Home Loan Bank of Atlanta (the “FHLB”). Its operation is regulated by the Federal Reserve and the Alabama Superintendent of Banks.

History
In 1907, Sheldon (Shel) L. Toomer, a successful businessman actively involved with community activities, established Bank of Auburn (now Auburn Bank) with his fellow merchants and faculty friends. The bank was located in the heart of downtown Auburn, which was an educational center in the early twentieth century. 

In 1964, the managers decided to change the bank's name to Auburn National Bank.

In 1991, the Bank became a member of the Federal Home Loan Bank of Atlanta (the “FHLB”), and in 1995, they changed the bank’s name again to Auburn Bank, which is also the bank’s current name.

In 2019, Auburn National Bancorporation, Inc. has stated the selection of Robert W. Dumas as Chairman of the Company's Board of Directors and AuburnBank, its subsidiary. Dumas has been the company's president and chief executive officer since 2001, when he was also appointed director of the company.

Board of Directors and Officers 

 Terry W. Andrus - Chief Executive Officer (Retired)
 C. Wayne Alderman - Secretary
 J. Tutt Barrett - Attorney
 Lauretta Jenkins Cooper - Executive Director
 Robert W. Dumas - Chairman, President & Chief Executive Officer

Source: Auburn Bank

References

External links
 

Bank of America
Companies listed on the Nasdaq
1907 establishments in Alabama
American companies established in 1907
Banks established in 1907
Banks based in Alabama
Financial services companies of the United States
Online brokerages
Mortgage lenders of the United States